Schildau can refer to three locations:

Schildau, a town in Germany
Kesselaid, an island in the Baltic Sea known in German as Schildau
Wojanów, a town in Poland known in German as Schildau